La Mulería is a village located in the municipality of Cuevas del Almanzora, in Almería province, Andalusia, Spain. As of 2020, it has a population of 140.

Geography 
La Mulería is located 87km northeast of Almería.

References

Populated places in the Province of Almería